A ghettoblaster or boombox is a portable audio player.

Ghettoblaster(s) or Ghetto Blaster(s) may also refer to:

Music
Albums
 Ghettoblaster (Armand Van Helden album), 2007
 Ghetto Blaster (Push Button Objects album), 2003
 Ghetto Blaster (Red Aunts album), 1998
 The Ghetto Blaster EP, an EP by Street Sweeper Social Club, 2010
 Ghetto Blaster, by The Crusaders, 1984
 Ghettoblaster, by Socalled, 2007
 Ghetto Blasters, by Mahala Rai Banda, 2009

Songs
 "Ghetto Blaster", by Teenage Fanclub from Deep Fried Fanclub
 "Ghetto Blaster", by Bobby Burns and Afrojack, 2009-2010 

Other
 Ghetto Blaster, a fictitious band on the 2000 compilation album Suitcase: Failed Experiments and Trashed Aircraft by Guided by Voices
 "Ghetto Blaster", a video introduction to Justin Timberlake's part of the 2003 Justified & Stripped Tour
 Ghetto Blaster Recordings, a record label run by Topon Das of the band Fuck the Facts

Other
 Ghetto Blaster (video game), a 1985 computer game
 The Ghetto Blasters or Harlem Heat, a professional wrestling tag team
 Ghetto Blaster, a James Bond gadget from the film The Living Daylights
 Ghetto Blaster was the finishing move of professional wrestler Bad News Brown